Huyghebaert is a surname. Notable people with the surname include:

Jan Huyghebaert (born 1945), Belgian businessman
Jérémy Huyghebaert (born 1989), Belgian footballer
Lien Huyghebaert (born 1982), Belgian sprinter
Yogi Huyghebaert (born 1944), Canadian politician

See also 

 Huyghe (disambiguation)
 Baert

Surnames
Surnames of Belgian origin